TodayTix  is a digital ticketing platform for theatrical and cultural events. Founded by two Broadway producers, TodayTix's free mobile apps for iOS and Android provide access to  theater shows in New York City, London's West End, Toronto, the San Francisco Bay Area, Los Angeles, Seattle, Philadelphia, Connecticut, Boston, Washington DC, Chicago, Houston, Dallas-Fort Worth, and Melbourne and Sydney in Australia.

History
Headquartered in New York City, the arts-meets-technology startup was founded in March 2013, by Broadway producers Brian M. Fenty (CEO & Co-Founder) and Merritt Baer (President & Co-Founder). As of 2013, fewer than .1% of tickets for Broadway shows were being bought via smartphone apps or otherwise using mobile devices, according to The Broadway League - presenting a large opportunity for TodayTix to better make theater accessible to millennials.  Fenty subsequently became CEO in 2017.

A beta version of the app was released in September 2013 for customers with iPhones to test. Within three months the app had been used to buy tickets 50,000 times. The TodayTix app was officially launched in December 2013.

In May 2014, the company received $1 million in an additional seed funding round from Rubicon Venture Capital, Ryan Rockefeller, Nicolas Jammet, and Jessica Verrilli. In November 2014, TodayTix announced its $5 million Series A financing from investors including Rubicon Venture Capital (again), TYLT Lab, Scott Birnbaum and SF Capital Group.

As of mid-2015, TodayTix began "selling roughly 3 percent of all the tickets on Broadway" and by February 2016, it was 4%. As of February 2021, 1.6 million people had purchased tickets via TodayTix, and 3.6 million users are registered customers.

In September 2018, TodayTix celebrated 5 years with a milestone of reaching $250 million in tickets sold. Following this anniversary, TodayTix launched an original content venture called "TodayTix Presents," that offers audiences first-look access to performances from their favorite artists debuting new work.

In May 2019, TodayTix announced a growth equity investment of $73 million, led by Great Hill Partners, to enter its next stage of growth.

In February 2020, TodayTix acquired Encore Tickets and its subsidiary brands, leading to the formation of TodayTix Group. TTG announced the acquisition of review aggregator website Show-Score in July 2020, and Broadway Roulette in May 2021 and Goldstar in January 2022, joining London Theatre and New York Theatre Guide. Show-Score, Broadway Roulette, and Goldstar continue to operate as independent brands under TodayTix Group's growing portfolio. In 2022, TodayTix announced plans to relocate its headquarters from 32 Avenue of the Americas to 1501 Broadway.

International expansion
In June 2015, TodayTix launched in London's West End and began offering the first paperless tickets for shows in London's West End theatre district in August 2015. In 2019 they expanded to Melbourne and Sydney, Australia

Operations and products
TodayTix launched the first-ever mobile lotteries for theater tickets, both on  Broadway and in London's West End, selling discounted same-day tickets via lotteries conducted through its apps.  It also features a special TodayTix Rush program, in which deeply discounted tickets are offered on a first-come first-serve basis the same day of a performance. Entrants can win up to two tickets for popular shows.

References

External links
 

Online marketplaces of the United States
Internet properties established in 2013
Ticket sales companies
2013 establishments in New York City